Eupithecia habermani is a moth in the family Geometridae first described by Jaan Viidalepp and Vladimir Mironov in 1988. It is found in the Russian Far East.

The wingspan is 21.5–22 mm. Adults are on wing in August.

References

Moths described in 1988
habermani
Moths of Asia